There are at least 177 members of the order Caryophyllales found in Montana.  Some of these species are exotics (not native to Montana) and some species have been designated as Species of Concern.

Amaranth
Family: Amaranthaceae

Amaranthus albus, white pigweed
Amaranthus arenicola, sandhills amaranth
Amaranthus blitoides, prostrate amaranth
Amaranthus californicus, California amaranth
Amaranthus hybridus, smooth amaranth
Amaranthus powellii, green amaranth
Amaranthus retroflexus, red-root pigweed
Amaranthus tuberculatus, roughfruit amaranth
Atriplex argentea, silvery saltbush
Atriplex canescens, four-wing saltbush
Atriplex confertifolia, shadscale
Atriplex dioica, thickleaf orach
Atriplex gardneri, Gardner's saltbush
Atriplex gardneri var. falcata, sickle saltbush
Atriplex heterosperma, two-scale saltbush
Atriplex hortensis, garden orach
Atriplex patula, halberd-leaf orache
Atriplex powellii, Powell's saltbush
Atriplex prostrata, creeping saltbush
Atriplex rosea, tumbling orache
Atriplex suckleyi, Suckley's saltbush
Atriplex truncata, wedge-leaved saltbush
Axyris amaranthoides, Russian-pigweed
Bassia hyssopifolia, five-horn smotherweed
Ceratoides lanata, winterfat
Chenopodium album, white goosefoot
Chenopodium atrovirens, dark goosefoot
Chenopodium berlandieri, pit-seed goosefoot
Chenopodium botrys, Jerusalem-oak
Chenopodium capitatum, strawberry goosefoot
Chenopodium capitatum var. parvicapitatum, Over's goosefoot
Chenopodium chenopodioides, low goosefoot
Chenopodium desiccatum, narrowleaf goosefoot
Chenopodium fremontii, Fremont's goosefoot
Chenopodium glaucum, oakleaf goosefoot
Chenopodium glaucum var. salinum, Rocky Mountain goosefoot
Chenopodium incanum, mealy goosefoot
Chenopodium leptophyllum, narrowleaf goosefoot
Chenopodium murale, nettle-leaf goosefoot
Chenopodium pratericola, desert goosefoot
Chenopodium rubrum, red goosefoot
Chenopodium rubrum var. humile, marshland goosefoot
Chenopodium rubrum var. rubrum, red goosefoot
Chenopodium simplex, giant-seed goosefoot
Chenopodium standleyanum, Standley's goosefoot
Chenopodium subglabrum, smooth goosefoot
Chenopodium watsonii, Watson's goosefoot
Corispermum americanum, American bugseed
Corispermum villosum, hairy bugseed
Cycloloma atriplicifolium, winged pigweed
Grayia spinosa, spiny hopsage
Halogeton glomeratus, halogeton
Kochia americana, red sage
Kochia prostrata, prostrate summer-cypress
Kochia scoparia, Mexican summer-cypress
Monolepis nuttalliana, Nuttall's poverty-weed
Salicornia rubra, western glasswort
Salsola collina, slender Russian-thistle
Salsola tragus, Russian-thistle
Suaeda calceoliformis, American sea-blite
Suaeda moquinii, Mojave sea-blite
Suaeda occidentalis, slender seepweed
Suckleya suckleyana, poison suckleya

Cactus

Family: Cactaceae
Coryphantha missouriensis, Missouri foxtail cactus
Coryphantha vivipara, spinystar cactus
Opuntia fragilis, brittle pricklypear
Opuntia polyacantha, Plains pricklypear
Pediocactus simpsonii, Simpson's hedgehog cactus

Carpetweed
Family: Molluginaceae
Mollugo verticillata, green carpetweed

Four-o-clock
Family: Nyctaginaceae
Abronia fragrans, fragrant white sand-verbena
Mirabilis albida, white four-o'clock
Mirabilis linearis, narrow-leaf four-o'clock
Mirabilis nyctaginea, heartleaf four-o'clock
Tripterocalyx micranthus, small-flower sand-verbena

Greasewood
Family: Sarcobataceae
Sarcobatus vermiculatus, black greasewood

Pinks

Family: Caryophyllaceae

Agrostemma githago, common corncockle
Arenaria aculeata, spiny sandwort
Arenaria capillaris, fescue sandwort
Arenaria congesta, capitate sandwort
Arenaria congesta var. cephaloidea, sharptip sandwort
Arenaria congesta var. congesta, ballhead sandwort
Arenaria congesta var. lithophila, rock-loving sandwort
Arenaria hookeri, Hooker's sandwort
Arenaria kingii, King's arenaria
Arenaria serpyllifolia, thymeleaf sandwort
Cerastium arvense, field chickweed
Cerastium beeringianum, bering sea chickweed
Cerastium brachypodum, shortstalk chickweed
Cerastium fontanum, common mouse-ear chickweed
Cerastium glomeratum, sticky mouse-ear chickweed
Cerastium nutans, nodding chickweed
Cerastium tomentosum, snow-in-summer
Dianthus armeria, Deptford pink
Dianthus barbatus, sweet-william
Dianthus deltoides, maiden-pink
Gypsophila paniculata, tall baby's-breath
Gypsophila scorzonerifolia, garden baby's-breath
Holosteum umbellatum, jagged chickweed
Minuartia austromontana, Columbian stitchwort
Minuartia nuttallii, Nuttall's sandwort
Minuartia obtusiloba, alpine stitchwort
Minuartia rubella, boreal stitchwort
Moehringia lateriflora, grove sandwort
Moehringia macrophylla, largeleaf sandwort
Myosoton aquaticum, giant-chickweed
Paronychia sessiliflora, low nailwort
Sagina nivalis, arctic pearlwort
Sagina procumbens, procumbent pearlwort
Sagina saginoides, arctic pearlwort
Saponaria officinalis, bouncing-bet
Scleranthus annuus, annual knawel
Silene acaulis, moss campion
Silene antirrhina, sleepy catchfly
Silene conoidea, conoid catchfly
Silene csereii, Balkan catchfly
Silene dichotoma, forked catchfly
Silene dioica, red catchfly
Silene douglasii, Douglas' campion
Silene drummondii, Drummond's campion
Silene flos-cuculi, ragged robin
Silene hitchguirei, mountain campion
Silene latifolia, bladder campion
Silene menziesii, Menzies' pink
Silene noctiflora, night-flowering catchfly
Silene oregana, Oregon catchfly
Silene parryi, Parry's campion
Silene repens, creeping catchfly
Silene scouleri, Scouler's catchfly
Silene spaldingii, Spalding's catchfly
Silene uralensis, apetalous catchfly
Silene vulgaris, maiden's-tears
Spergula arvensis, cornspurry
Spergularia media, middle-size sandspurry
Spergularia rubra, purple sandspurry
Spergularia salina, saltmarsh sandspurry
Stellaria americana, American stitchwort
Stellaria borealis, northern stitchwort
Stellaria calycantha, northern stitchwort
Stellaria crassifolia, fleshy stitchwort
Stellaria crispa, crimped stitchwort
Stellaria graminea, little starwort
Stellaria jamesiana, James stitchwort
Stellaria longifolia, longleaf stitchwort
Stellaria longipes, long-stalked stitchwort
Stellaria media, common starwort
Stellaria nitens, shiny stitchwort
Stellaria obtusa, Rocky Mountain stitchwort
Stellaria umbellata, umbellate stitchwort
Vaccaria hispanica, cowcockle

Purslane

Family: Portulacaceae

Cistanthe umbellata, Mt. Hood pussy-paws
Claytonia arenicola, sand springbeauty
Claytonia cordifolia, heart-leaf springbeauty
Claytonia lanceolata, springbeauty
Claytonia megarhiza, alpine springbeauty
Claytonia multiscapa, Rydberg's springbeauty
Claytonia parviflora, little-flower springbeauty
Claytonia perfoliata, miner's-lettuce
Claytonia sibirica, Siberian springbeauty
Lewisia columbiana, Columbia lewisia
Lewisia pygmaea, alpine bitterroot
Lewisia rediviva, bitterroot
Lewisia triphylla, three-leaf bitterroot
Montia chamissoi, Chamisso's miner's-lettuce
Montia dichotoma, dwarf miner's-lettuce
Montia linearis, linearleaf miner's-lettuce
Montia parvifolia, little-leaf miner's-lettuce
Portulaca oleracea, common purslane
Talinum calycinum, large-flower flameflower

Further reading

See also
 List of dicotyledons of Montana

Notes

Montana